When Harry Met Santa is a Christmas-themed advertisement for Posten Norge, the Norwegian postal service. It was released in November 2021 in advance of the 50th anniversary of the decriminalisation of sex between men in Norway in 2022.

Content
The advert – which gets its title from the 1989 romantic comedy film When Harry Met Sally... – shows a man named Harry seeking a relationship with Santa Claus. Harry first sees Santa as when he delivers presents to his home one year, and their relationship develops year-on-year. Harry eventually writes a love letter to Santa, saying "all I want for Christmas is you", before he and Santa kiss each other. Santa then asks for help from Posten Norge, the Norwegian postal service, to deliver presents on his behalf on Christmas Eve, so he can spend more time with Harry, his new boyfriend.

Reception 
The advert quickly became a viral phenomenon worldwide, with most initial responses being "almost universally positive" and emotional in nature. It received positive responses from Canadian MP Randall Garrison and former U.S. ambassador to Denmark Rufus Gifford. 

However, the advert was criticised for sexualising Santa by some critics in the United Kingdom, such as Dawn Neesom (a columnist for the Daily Star, a tabloid newspaper) and Melanie Blake (a commentator and author). Katie Edwards, a British author and academic, said in The Independent that such criticism was based on anti-gay tropes and the "villainisation of gay male sexuality", whereby two men kissing is seen as an inherently sexual act or behaviour, but a man and a woman kissing is not, as it is considered the norm by society. László Kövér, the speaker of the Hungarian National Assembly, accused the advert of desecrating Christmas.

The advert was not controversial in Norway and has been seen as an example of changing attitudes in the country as a result of campaigning by LGBT rights activists such as Kim Friele. This includes the decriminalisation of homosexuality in 1972 and the legalisation of same-sex marriage in 2009.

See also 
 Heterosexism – a system of attitudes, bias, and discrimination in favour of female–male sexuality and relationships
 Mrs. Claus – the traditional legendary wife of Santa Claus
Santa's Husband  – 2017 American children's picture book
 Section 213 of the Norwegian Penal Code – the Norwegian sodomy law that was repealed in 1972
 Snegurochka, or the Snow Maiden – the legendary granddaughter of Ded Moroz (Father Frost) in East Slavic nations

References

External links 
 When Harry met Santa ENG SUB on YouTube

Advertising campaigns
Christmas in Norway
Advertising and marketing controversies
LGBT-related controversies in television
Santa Claus
LGBT in Norway
2020s television commercials
LGBT portrayals in mass media